Bull SAS (also known as Groupe Bull, Bull Information Systems, or simply Bull) is a French computer company headquartered in Les Clayes-sous-Bois, in the western suburbs of Paris. The company has also been known at various times as Bull General Electric, Honeywell Bull, CII Honeywell Bull, and Bull HN. Bull was founded in 1931, as H.W. Egli - Bull, to capitalize on the punched card technology patents of Norwegian engineer Fredrik Rosing Bull (1882–1925). After a reorganization in 1933, with new owners coming in, the name was changed to Compagnie des Machines Bull (CMB). Bull has a worldwide presence in more than 100 countries and is particularly active in the defense, finance, health care, manufacturing, public, and telecommunication sectors.

History

Origins 

On 31 July 1919, a Norwegian engineer named Fredrik Rosing Bull filed a patent for a "combined sorter-recorder-tabulator of punch cards" machine that he had developed with financing from the Norwegian insurance company Storebrand.  Storebrand integrated his device into its operations in 1921. The following year Bull sold his second machine to the Danish insurer Hafnia who had learned of the technology through an article in an insurance trade magazine. At the time of Bull's death of cancer in 1925 at the age of 43, a dozen of his machines had been sold to different companies throughout Europe. The commercial and technical development of the machines continued under the direction of Bull's childhood friend and long-time collaborator Reidar Knutsen along with his brother Kurt Andréas Knutsen.

As the business grew several outside investors were brought in, leading to the incorporation of the company H.W. Egli Bull in 1931. In 1933, more investors joined and the company changed its name to Compagnie des Machines Bull, a name it would keep until 1964.

Growth 
The company has undergone many takeovers and mergers since its formation. In particular, it has had various ownership relations with General Electric, Honeywell, and NEC from the 1960s to the 1980s; and with Motorola, Debeka,  and France Télécom more recently. It acquired Honeywell Information Systems in the late 1980s, and later also had a share of Zenith Data Systems and Packard Bell. Bull was nationalised in 1982 and was merged with most of the rest of the French computer industry.

Groupe Bull bought Zenith Electronics in late December 1989. It kept Zenith Data Systems' headquarters and plants in Chicago and St. Joseph, Michigan. In 1994, the company was re-privatised.

In August 2014, the French IT company Atos announced that it had acquired a controlling stake in Bull SA through a tender offer launched in May.  Atos announced plans in October, 2014 to buy out or squeeze out the remaining share and bondholders.

Bull launched the Hoox m2, the first integrally secured European smartphone, which in June 2014 was approved for use with data classified as 'Restricted Information' ('Diffusion Restreinte') by the Agence nationale de la sécurité des systèmes d'information (ANSSI). The Hoox range of secure mobiles and smartphones ensures confidentiality of voice, SMS, e-mail and data communication.

Products and services

Hardware

 Supercomputers
  servers (Linux and Windows), Escala servers (AIX) and mainframes GCOS (design, manufacturing, distribution)
 Data storage and backup systems, cloud computing infrastructure
 Mobile/smart phones (Hoox)

Software and services
 Open source (Novaforge.org portal)
 Information technology consulting and services, custom solutions development for clients 
 Systems integration
 Human resource and social welfare management systems
 Managed services and web hosting 
 Support
 Training

Information security 
 Public key infrastructure 
 Electronic signature solutions
 Encryption solutions (hardware and software)
 Digital payment security 
 Identity, authentication and access management
 High availability and disaster recovery
 Systems and network monitoring

Corporate structure 

Groupe Bull:
 Bull SAS 
 Agarik (Managed services, web hosting)
 HRBC (Human Resources systems)
 Bull PI (Engineering, research)
 Sirus (Social welfare management systems for the public sector)
 Bull International SAS
 Evidian (Security; identity and access management)
 Serviware (high performance computing)
 Amesys SAS :
 Amesys Consulting (including Amesys International) 
 Amesys RSS (including TRCOM)
 Elexo (networking and telecommunications equipment)

Amesys controversy

Amesys, a Groupe Bull subsidiary specializing in defense and aerospace-related systems and software, became embroiled in controversy in 2011 when it was revealed that it had sold an internet monitoring system to the Muammar Gaddafi regime of Libya in 2007.  The Eagle System was used by the Gaddafi regime to spy on citizens and foreign journalists.  On 12 March 2013 Reporters Without Borders named Amesys as one of five "Corporate Enemies of the Internet" and "digital era mercenaries" for selling products that have been or are being used by governments to violate human rights and freedom of information.  A judicial inquiry was opened by the French government in May 2012 following allegations of complicity in torture by the International Federation for Human Rights (FIDH).  In March 2012 Groupe Bull divested itself of the Eagle System, selling it for the sum of 4 million euros to Nexa Technologies, a company run by a former Amesys CEO.

References

Further reading

 Pierre Mounier-Kuhn, "From General Electric to Bull: A case of managerial knowledge transfer (1956-1970)", Entreprises et Histoire, June 2014, n° 75, p. 42-56. http://www.cairn.info/revue-entreprises-et-histoire-2014-2-page-42.htm
History of Bull Extracted and translated from Science et Vie Micro magazine, No. 74, July–August, 1990: The very international history of a French giant
BULL computers chronological history

External links

The history of Bull Group companies
Virtual Museum of Bull and French Computer Science

French companies established in 1931
Companies formerly listed on the Paris Bourse
Computer hardware companies
Electronics companies established in 1931
Electronics companies of France
Mobile phone manufacturers
Privately held companies of France
Privatized companies of France
Telecommunications companies of France
French brands
Software companies of France
Computer surveillance
Groupe Bull